Streptomyces polychromogenes is a bacterium species from the genus of Streptomyces which has been isolated from soil in Venezuela. Streptomyces polychromogenes produces o-carbamylserine.

See also 
 List of Streptomyces species

References

Further reading

External links
Type strain of Streptomyces polychromogenes at BacDive -  the Bacterial Diversity Metadatabase

polychromogenes
Bacteria described in 1964